Gurltia paralysans is a parasite which attaches itself to the veins of South American felines

The genus name comes from Ernst Friedrich Gurlt (1794–1882), a German veterinarian and anatomist.

References

External links 
 uniprot

Strongylida
Parasitic nematodes of mammals
Nematodes described in 1933